CMTS may refer to: 

 U.S. Committee on the Marine Transportation System, an inter-agency committee authorized to coordinate policies affecting the U.S. Marine Transportation System
 Cable modem termination system, a piece of equipment which is used to provide high speed data services to cable subscribers